Coronita (Spanish for "Small crown") is a census-designated place in Riverside County, California. The 2010 United States census reported Coronita's population was 2,608.

Geography
According to the United States Census Bureau, the CDP covers an area of 0.7 square miles (1.8 km), all of it land. It is mostly surrounded by the Corona city limits.

Demographics

At the 2010 census Coronita had a population of 2,608. The racial makeup of Coronita was 1,649 (63.2%) White (39.7% Non-Hispanic White), 38 (1.5%) African American, 31 (1.2%) Native American, 108 (4.1%) Asian, 12 (0.5%) Pacific Islander, 688 (26.4%) from other races, and 82 (3.1%) from two or more races. Hispanic or Latino of any race were 1,349 persons (51.7%).

The census reported that 2,593 people (99.4% of the population) lived in households, 15 (0.6%) lived in non-institutionalized group quarters, and no one was institutionalized.

There were 705 households, 313 (44.4%) had children under the age of 18 living in them, 446 (63.3%) were opposite-sex married couples living together, 85 (12.1%) had a female householder with no husband present, 47 (6.7%) had a male householder with no wife present.  There were 28 (4.0%) unmarried opposite-sex partnerships, and 1 (0.1%) same-sex married couples or partnerships. 100 households (14.2%) were one person and 49 (7.0%) had someone living alone who was 65 or older. The average household size was 3.68.  There were 578 families (82.0% of households); the average family size was 4.01.

The age distribution was 738 people (28.3%) under the age of 18, 292 people (11.2%) aged 18 to 24, 694 people (26.6%) aged 25 to 44, 597 people (22.9%) aged 45 to 64, and 287 people (11.0%) who were 65 or older.  The median age was 33.8 years. For every 100 females, there were 101.4 males.  For every 100 females age 18 and over, there were 104.6 males.

There were 736 housing units at an average density of 1,059.4 per square mile, of the occupied units 591 (83.8%) were owner-occupied and 114 (16.2%) were rented. The homeowner vacancy rate was 1.7%; the rental vacancy rate was 7.3%.  2,141 people (82.1% of the population) lived in owner-occupied housing units and 452 people (17.3%) lived in rental housing units.

According to the 2010 United States Census, Coronita had a median household income of $76,713, with 12.8% of the population living below the poverty line.

Government
Federal:
California is represented in the United States Senate by Democrats Dianne Feinstein and Alex Padilla.

State:

Local:
In the Riverside County Board of Supervisors, Coronita is in the Second District, represented by Karen Spiegel.

References

Census-designated places in Riverside County, California
Census-designated places in California